Small Business School was a weekly, half-hour television program that began airing in 1994 first in the United States on PBS-member stations and then throughout the world via the Voice of America. The show traveled throughout the United States and the rest of the world to meet with the founders of small businesses that had been in operation for at least ten years and were honored by their community and industry for making the world a better place. The PBS Adult Learning Satellite Service syndicated the series to most every college and university throughout the USA.

The program was titled "Small Business Today" until 1995. Then, it was renamed to "Small Business 2000."  The producers said, "We never expected to be still producing in 2000, so we had to re-brand the show a third time."   

Throughout the interviews, these owners talk about how they got their idea for a business, how they got started, and how they got over the hurdles.  Many even talk about their initial failures. These interviews provide insight and inspiration for all business owners.

Each episode has a transcript, a case study guide, an overview and a homepage to provide a means for viewers to further study each episode.

The show was on the air most actively between 1994 and 2008. It has been in re-runs on PBS and PEG stations around the country. Case study guides were first prepared for the PBS Adult Learning Satellite Service feed where then made available to all the colleges and universities throughout the world by being included within 50 basic textbooks used in business schools. The selection of a business to profile was most often selected from among nominations within a local chamber of commerce or a national trade association. For over 50 seasons the show was sponsored by many large American companies and for one season by the U.S. Small Business Administration.

In December 1994 the television show put up its first website. The transcripts, case study guides and overview were all posted. By 1999 this online school for business owners began streaming video of key episodes.  By 2006, each key point within most of the weekly episodes began streaming as a short-burst, user-selected videos between one and five minutes long.  There were over 1800 video clips on the site that addressed key issues that typical business owners face every day.

References

External links
 Small Business School on YouTube
 U.S. Small Business Administration

PBS original programming
1994 American television series debuts
Adult education television series
Small business
2008 American television series endings